Tomasz Marczyński (born 6 March 1984) is a Polish former road racing cyclist, who rode professionally between 2006 and 2021 for the  (2006–08),  (2009),  (2010–11 and 2014),  (2012–13),  (2015) and  (2016–21) teams.

Biography
Marczyński was born in Kraków, Poland, and he started as a trainee for the Krakus Swoszowice team, staying with them from 1998–2002, and then riding for Pacyfik Toruń from 2003–2005. In 2006 he began a professional career with the Italian team . In 2007, he won the Polish national road race championship. In September 2015 it was reported that Marczyński would join  for the 2016 season, returning to the WorldTour ranks for the first time since 2013.

He was named in the start list for the 2017 Giro d'Italia.

In the 2017 Vuelta a Espana, Marczynski achieved his greatest successes to date in Grand Tours by winning two stages, the 6th and the 12th. In July 2018, he was named in the start list for the 2018 Tour de France. Marczyński retired from competition at the end of the 2021 season.

Major results

2005
 9th Trofeo Internazionale Bastianelli
2006
 2nd Road race, National Road Championships
2007
 1st  Road race, National Road Championships
 3rd Grand Prix of Aargau Canton
 8th Overall Route du Sud
 9th Overall Vuelta a Chihuahua
 10th GP Triberg-Schwarzwald
2008
 2nd Overall Clásica Internacional de Alcobendas
 5th Overall Vuelta a Asturias
1st Stage 4
2009
 9th Overall Brixia Tour
2010
 1st  Overall Tour de Seoul
1st Stage 1
 2nd Coupe des Carpathes
 3rd Overall Szlakiem Grodów Piastowskich
1st Stage 2
 5th Overall Szlakiem Walk Majora Hubala
 5th Overall Tour of Hainan
 10th Overall Vuelta a Murcia
2011
 National Road Championships
1st  Road race
1st  Time trial
 1st  Overall Tour of Małopolska
 3rd Memoriał Henryka Łasaka
2012
 1st  Mountains classification Tour de Pologne
 1st  Sprints classification Volta a Catalunya
 1st  Mountains classification Vuelta a Murcia
 3rd Rund um Köln
 8th Overall Tour of Beijing
2013
 1st  Mountains classification Tour de Pologne
2014
 8th Overall Szlakiem Grodów Piastowskich
2015
 1st  Road race, National Road Championships
 1st  Overall Tour du Maroc
1st Stages 1, 4 & 7
 1st  Overall Tour of Black Sea
1st Mountains classification
1st Stage 1
 8th Overall Tour of Turkey
2017
 Vuelta a España
1st Stages 6 & 12
2019
 1st  Mountains classification Tour of Guangxi
2020
 6th Pollença–Andratx

Grand Tour general classification results timeline

References

External links

  
 
 

1984 births
Living people
Sportspeople from Kraków
Polish male cyclists
Cyclists at the 2008 Summer Olympics
Olympic cyclists of Poland
Polish Vuelta a España stage winners